John Jackson Smyth, QC (27 June 1941 – 11 August 2018) was a British barrister and recorder, who was also involved in Christian ministry. In early 2017, reports emerged that he had performed sadistic beatings on schoolboys and young men who regarded him as a spiritual father. Anglican Bishop Andrew Watson disclosed that, as a young man, he was a victim. Smyth died while under investigation, so criminal charges were never brought against him, but an independent review concluded that he abused at least 13 people, and the abuse was also emotional and spiritual, as well as physical.

Personal life

Smyth was born in Canada on 27 June 1941. He attended Strathcona School, Calgary. His family subsequently moved to England, where he was educated at Trinity Hall, Cambridge, and Trinity College, Bristol. During the 1970s and early 1980s, he lived in Winchester while practising law in London. He moved to Zimbabwe in 1984, and later to South Africa. Smyth died on 11 August 2018 at his home in Cape Town. Per a statement from his family: "The official cause of death has not yet been made known, but the indicators are that it was a sudden heart attack following a heart procedure earlier in the week."

Legal career

He was called to the Bar at Inner Temple in 1965 and took silk in 1979. He was a recorder (with the powers of a circuit judge able to sit in the Crown Court, the County Court or the Family Court) from 1978 to 1984.

In July 1977, Smyth acted for Christian morality campaigner Mary Whitehouse in her successful private prosecution for blasphemy (Whitehouse v Lemon) at the Old Bailey against the newspaper Gay News and its editor, Denis Lemon, over the publication of James Kirkup's poem The Love that Dares to Speak its Name. He also initially acted for Whitehouse in her failed prosecution of the National Theatre production of Howard Brenton's play The Romans in Britain in 1980 but withdrew from the case through illness.

Later, while living in Cape Town, South Africa, he ran the Justice Alliance of South Africa (JASA) for some years. JASA describes itself as "a coalition of corporations‚ individuals and churches committed to upholding and fighting for justice and the highest moral standards in South African society".

Smyth represented South Africa's Doctors for Life, and, as an amicus curiae of the Constitutional Court in May 2005, unsuccessfully opposed the legalisation of same-sex marriage in South Africa. Smyth claimed that to introduce same-sex marriage, would result in "violence to the mind and spirit" of the religiously devout and would discriminate against them.

It emerged on 3 February 2017 that the board of the Alliance had asked Smyth to immediately stand down as the head of the organisation. His standing-down was described as temporary, but his return was not thought likely.

Christian work 
Smyth was chairman of the Iwerne Trust between 1974 and 1981. This organisation raised funds for evangelical Christian holiday camps that had been founded by Eric "Bash" Nash for public school pupils, at the time run by Scripture Union, and in which Smyth was a leader.

Smyth moved to Zimbabwe in 1984, where in 1986 he set up mission Zambesi Ministries, which held summer camps for boys from the country's leading schools. He was arrested in 1997 in the investigation into the drowning of Guide Nyachuru, a 16-year-old adolescent, at the Marondera camp. Nyachuru's unclothed body was found at Ruzawi School pool in December 1992. Smyth always said that his death was an accident. The possibility of culpable homicide was after a long investigation ruled as unlikely, but raised doubts about his behaviour towards boys in his care. He subsequently moved to South Africa.

Abuse allegations

Early reports 
An internal report from the Iwerne Trust in 1982, compiled by Mark Ruston of the Round Church Cambridge and David Fletcher of the Scripture Union, referred to "horrific" beatings of teenage boys, who sometimes suffered bleeding. Winchester College, with its pupils among alleged victims, was informed about the alleged beatings but both the college and the trust failed to inform the police about Smyth. The headmaster asked Smyth to keep away from the college and not to contact its pupils.

There were two early publications which mentioned Smyth's abusive behaviour without naming him.

In February 1989, John Thorn, the headmaster of Winchester College during the years that Smyth was active, released his autobiography, which included the following:

On 3 February 2017, two days after Smyth was publicly named as an abuser, Atkins revealed via an article in The Daily Telegraph that she had referred to him in her 2012 article. The independent review commissioned by Winchester College and published in January 2022 included the above passage from Thorn's autobiography and indicated that it was a reference to Smyth.

Public exposure 
Smyth was first publicly named as an abuser by an article in The Daily Telegraph published on 1 February 2017. The article indicated that Channel 4 News would be broadcasting a report on Smyth's violent physical abuse of young men. The report aired the next day and showed Smyth being doorstepped by reporter Cathy Newman, while on a Christmas and New Year visit to friends in Bristol, England. Smyth commented that he was "not talking about what we did at all" and said some of the claims were "nonsense".

Shortly after the report the Bishop of Guildford, Andrew Watson disclosed that he was one of Smyth's victims.

After the abuse became public, Graham Tilby, national safeguarding adviser for the Church of England, said: "Clearly, more could have been done at the time to look further into the case." Smyth was excommunicated from the Church-on-Main in Cape Town after church leaders said he refused to return to the UK and engage with police.

On 10 April 2017, BBC News At Ten reported that Simon Doggart was a victim of Smyth, but he had been recruited to administer further beatings. 

In June 2020, the Church of England removed final diocesan permission to officiate from George Carey, a former Archbishop of Canterbury, having found of him procedural failings, either in his reviewing or not having reviewed by other bodies some of the old allegations against Smyth. Permission was restored to Carey by the Bishop of Oxford seven months later.

A book documenting Smyth's abuse was published in September 2021. Bleeding For Jesus: John Smyth and the cult of the Iwerne Camps was written by Andrew Graystone, a journalist and theologian who had been involved in the exposure of Smyth.

In January 2022, Winchester College apologised for abuse perpetrated by Smyth, following the release of an independent review that the College had commissioned.

References

Further reading 

 Graystone, Andrew (2021). Bleeding For Jesus: John Smyth and the cult of the Iwerne Camps. Darton, Longman, and Todd. ISBN 978-1913657123
 Pickles, Jan & Woods, Genevieve (18 January 2022). Review Into The Abuse By John Smyth Of Pupils And Former Pupils Of Winchester College

1941 births
2018 deaths
Alumni of Trinity Hall, Cambridge
Alumni of Trinity College, Bristol
Members of the Inner Temple
British King's Counsel
British expatriates in South Africa
British expatriates in Zimbabwe
Child abuse in England
Child abuse in South Africa
Child abuse in Zimbabwe
Violence against men in Africa
Violence against men in the United Kingdom